Maria, Lady Eardley is an oil on canvas by the English artist, Thomas Gainsborough, painted around the time of her marriage in 1766, according to British art historian, Ellis Waterhouse, in “Preliminary Check List of Portraits by Thomas Gainsborough,” The Volume of the Walpole Society 33 (1948 –1950): 34. It has been in the collections of Nationalmuseum in Stockholm since 1966.

The sitter is Maria Marow Gideon nee Wilmot, later Lady Eardley (1743–1794), the daughter of judge John Eardley Wilmot and his wife Sarah Rivett. In December, 1766 she married Sampson Gideon, a banker who in 1789 was elevated to the Irish peerage to become Lord Eardley with a name from her father's maternal family.

She is just over 23 years of age in the painting. She is facing us wearing an elegant blue and white wrapping dress. She holds a flower in her hand and pearls glisten in her hair. 

Gainsborough was one of England's leading 18th century portrait and landscape painters. He was a contemporary of Joshua Reynolds who painted the sitter before and after her marriage. Both specialized in portraits of the British aristocracy. This work is highly representative of Gainsborough's depictions of the British élite – they emerge in full figure from wooded landscapes. Grandeur was key, in content and form, and the portraits were usually full-length. He was also an accomplished landscape painter, and here the young woman is framed by the backdrop of a romantically leafy landscape garden. Gainsborough was a master at rendering aristocratic extravagance in a natural setting.

References

Portraits by Thomas Gainsborough
1770 paintings
Paintings in the collection of the Nationalmuseum Stockholm